Sharon Jordan (born March 11, 1960) is an American actress. One of her notable roles is Irene the Concierge in the Disney Channel sitcom The Suite Life of Zack & Cody. Jordan also appeared as Irene in That's So Suite Life of Hannah Montana, the first Disney crossover special with the three shows, The Suite Life of Zack & Cody, Hannah Montana, and That's So Raven.  In addition, Jordan has co-starred on several independent films including Day in the Life of Doe, Rift, I.D., Dead End Falls, Blind, and Some Sunny Day.
 
Jordan's recurring guest star roles on the Disney Channel are significant, and previous actors in her position have consequently been offered a bevy of big screen offers. Better known on the stage than the screen, her range as an actress has been displayed by a large array of roles, which include murderous characters in Agatha Christie plays and romantic leads in Greek comedies.

For several years, Jordan performed onstage in Welcome Home, Soldier, one of the longest-running plays in Los Angeles, California.  It is a production of the Playhouse West Repertory Theater group and was written by Tony Savant and directed by Robert Carnegie.

Personal life
Jordan was born in Fontana and raised in Riverside. Jordan attended Riverside Polytechnic High School and graduated in the summer of 1977; her graduating class was 1978. Jordan resides in Los Angeles, California, with her husband and their two daughters.

Education
For undergraduate courses, Jordan attended college at Riverside Community College and Cabrillo College. She then earned a Bachelor's degree and a Master's degree in Psychology from California State University, San Bernardino. Jordan specialized in neuropsychology, particularly working with children who suffered from brain traumas.

Writing

Jordan has published numerous poems in magazines and journals as well as a mystery and suspense novel, Time Shadows, which is the Book One in the trilogy The Shadow Chronicles. Currently Jordan is editing the print galley for Death Shadows, the second book in The Shadow Chronicles series. Jordan was also named author of the month for Red & Proud.

For several years, Jordan has been an interviewer for Cultscoop, an online magazine devoted to authors, actors, and filmmakers.

Filmography

References

External links

Sharon Jordan at Author's Den
Sharon Jordan on about.me
Sharon Jordan on CafeMom
Sharon Jordan's Official Website
Talent profile of Sharon Jordan on SlateCast.com

1960 births
21st-century American actresses
Actresses from California
American film actresses
American television actresses
Living people
People from Fontana, California